The Santa Fe Writers Project (SFWP) was founded in 1998 by Andrew Gifford. It began as a small effort supported by writers and arts advocates, and has since grown into a well-known independent press. SFWP hosts a literary awards program and an online journal.

In addition to publishing literary fiction, and creative non-fiction, the press also reprints out-of-print books of literary merit or social value.

While the press is largely operated from Bethesda, Maryland it was founded in Santa Fe, New Mexico where Gifford has family. The earliest titles were funded personally by Gifford's savings, often resulting in a loss.

Publishing  
With over 60 titles in print, the press publishes around four to six titles a year, following a traditional three-season release with a 9-12 month pre-publication period. SFWP prides itself on challenging the publishing norms and its catalog is eclectic, featuring flash fiction, short stories, graphic art, literary novels, fantasy, young adult, children's picture books, mystery, and poetry. Distributed globally by The Independent Publishers Group, SFWP also works aggressively with the subrights market and has sold translations in Chinese, Turkish, and Spanish, as well as numerous audiobook rights.   The press has been recognized by The Guardian, BuzzFeed Books, and BookRiot, The Millions as a publisher of high-quality titles.

Notable authors
Alan Cheuse
Bonnie Chau
Richard Currey
Wendy J. Fox
Pagan Kennedy
Ray Robertson
George Shipway

References

External links 
 Official website

Book publishing companies of the United States
Publishing companies established in 1998